"Moonlight Sunrise" is a song recorded by South Korean girl group Twice. It was released as their second English-language single on January 20, 2023, through JYP Entertainment and Republic Records. It serves as a pre-release single of the group's twelfth extended play, Ready to Be, released in March. It is primarily an upbeat Miami bass, R&B and pop track that incorporates house, synth-pop, and dreamy elements in its production.

Background and release
On December 21, 2022, Twice posted a poster showing the text "Twice / Our Youth" with the caption "First, 1/4 of 2023", revealing that they would release the second all-English single in January 2023, their first since "The Feels" in 2021, and their twelfth extended play in March of the same year. On January 3, 2023, Twice shared their new English single title on their social media account, called "Moonlight Sunrise", to be released on January 20. Individual and group concept photos were posted between January 10 and 15. The music video teaser was released through Twice's YouTube account on January 17.

Composition
"Moonlight Sunrise" was co-produced by Earattack and Lee Woo-hyun, and co-written by Nina Ann Nelson and Kaedi Dalley of Citizen Queen. It is an upbeat Miami bass, R&B, and pop song. The track incorporates a synth-pop arrangement with house influences, a dreamy melody, and lyrics that "explore the urgency of love" In terms of musical notation, the song is written  in the key of C Major and has a tempo of 125 beats per minute.

In an interview with People, Jihyo said the inspiration for the song came from the final concert of Twice 4th World Tour III at Banc of California Stadium: "During the tour, we had performed under the moonlight and we were dancing, and the composer for this song was there. He found our performance so beautiful, so that was what the inspiration of this song." Tzuyu shared the meaning of "Moonlight Sunrise" during an appearance on The Kelly Clarkson Show, explaining that the song is about "wanting to know the other person's heart, and they use the metaphor of 'moonlight' and 'sunrise' to parallel that fluttering heart feeling when you're in love."

Critical reception 

Rolling Stone India reviewed the song and stated that "it exudes romance with a synth-pop arrangement, further intensified with house influences. The dreamy melody breathes life into the lyrics that explore the urgency of love. The dizzying love confession sees the members of Twice boldly confess their ardor; 'Baby, I don't really mean to rush/ But I’ma really need your touch/ If I’ma make it through the night/ I got the moonlight/ Tequila sunrise/ Uh, come take a shot on me, I got ya'". Joshua Minsoo Kim, writing for NPR Music, said the song was "one of the most thrilling English songs from a K-pop group ever" and praised its "faithful interpretation" of the Atlanta bass genre.

Commercial performance

"Moonlight Sunrise" marks the group's second entry on Billboard Hot 100, which makes Twice the fourth K-pop group to have two or more songs on the chart, joining BTS, Blackpink, and New Jeans.

Track listing 
Remixes EP
"Moonlight Sunrise" – 3:00
"Moonlight Sunrise" (House remix) – 3:38
"Moonlight Sunrise" (Club remix) – 3:51
"Moonlight Sunrise" (R&B remix) – 3:13
"Moonlight Sunrise" (instrumental) – 3:00

Credits and personnel 

 Twice – vocals
 Sophia Pae – background vocals
 Earattack – songwriter, producer, arranger, keyboard, bass, drum programming, vocal director, recording
 Nina Ann Nelson – songwriter
 Kaedi Dalley – songwriter
 Lee Woo-hyun – songwriter, producer, arranger, keyboard, bass, drum programming
 Lee Kyeong-won – digital editing
 Goo Hye-jin – recording
 Lim Chan-mi – recording
 Lee Tae-sub – mixing
 Kwon Nam-woo – mastering
 Haneul Lee – immersive mix engineering
 Jung-hoon Choi – immersive mix engineering

Charts

Release history

References

2023 singles
2023 songs
English-language South Korean songs
Miami bass songs
South Korean pop songs
South Korean contemporary R&B songs
JYP Entertainment singles
Republic Records singles
Twice (group) songs